The Canadian Journal of Economics and Political Science was an academic journal established in 1928. From 1928 to 1934 it was published under the title Contributions to Canadian Economics. In 1967–1968 the journal was split into the Canadian Journal of Economics and the Canadian Journal of Political Science.

References 

Political science journals
Economics journals
Publications established in 1935
Multilingual journals
Publications disestablished in 1967
Wiley-Blackwell academic journals
Political science in Canada
1928 establishments in Canada
Cambridge University Press academic journals